Sidi Ali is a town and commune in Mostaganem Province, Algeria. It is the capital of Sidi Ali District. According to the 1998 census it has a population of 31,840.

References

Communes of Mostaganem Province
Cities in Algeria
Algeria